Hotel Equatoria was a hotel in Kampala, the capital of Uganda, the third-largest economy in the East African Community. It was a member of the Imperial Hotels Group.

Location
The hotel was located on the corner of William Street and Kyaggwe Road, in the heart of Kampala's central business district. Adjacent landmarks include the PostBank House, across the street on William Street, Kampala Pentecostal Church, on Kyaggwe Road and Sun City Shopping Arcade, on Kampala Road. The coordinates of the hotel were: 0°19'05.0" N, 32°34'25.0" E (latitude: 0.318056; longitude: 32.573611).

Overview
Centrally located within the business and commercial center of Kampala city, Hotel Equatoria had a total of eighty nine rooms, including: twenty four Standard Rooms, forty Deluxe Rooms, twenty four Executive Rooms and one Family Room. Each room had central air-conditioning, an in-room electronic safe and mini-bar, a work desk and Video and Satellite Television. The hotel also had a subterranean, air-conditioned discotheque.

Recent developments
In December 2009, the owners of the hotel transformed it into a shopping mall, with 700 separate shops; (Equatoria Shopping Mall).

Ownership
The shopping mall is a member of the Imperial Hotels Group.

See also
 Kampala Capital City Authority
 Nakasero
 Kampala
 Kampala Central Division
 List of hotels in Uganda

References

External links
 Profile at Travelhemispheres.com

Hotels in Uganda
Hotels in Kampala
Kampala Central Division
Defunct hotels